Chiverton Cross is a road junction in west Cornwall, England, United Kingdom, about four miles (6 kilometres) north-east of Redruth and five miles (8 km) west of Truro at . Its name derives from Chyverton House which is in the extreme east of the parish of Perranzabuloe.

Three parishes 
The junction is the point where the parishes of St Agnes (northwest and west), Perranzabuloe (northeast) and Kenwyn (east and south) meet. The scattered settlement of Three Burrows lies south of Chiverton Cross; it is in the parish of Kenwyn and to the west is Two Burrows.

Roundabout 

Chiverton Cross is where the A390 trunk road from Truro and the B3277 to St Agnes meet the east-west A30 trunk road. Westward from the roundabout, the A30 is a dual carriageway road: to the east is a 7-mile single carriageway section. To the south-east, the A390 is also single carriageway. This leads to congestion at busy times of day.

Improvement works by Cornwall Council since May 2010 have caused various carriageway closures westbound between Chiverton Cross and Avers Roundabout, north of Redruth and eastbound and westbound between Chiverton Cross and Chybucca, the junction for Perranporth and Truro.

There are motorists' services by the roundabout including the Chiverton Arms pub (illustrated right), a Starbucks coffee shop (formerly a Little Chef restaurant) and two filling stations.

Chyverton House 
Chyverton House is a country house northeast of Chiverton Cross and about 6 miles north of Truro. The house was built in the early to mid 18th century and extended c. 1775 for John Thomas. The materials used were brick at the front and killas rubble at the rear; the roofs are of Delabole slate. It has been a Grade II* listed building since 1952.

The garden was laid out by John Thomas at the end of the 18th century. The damming of a small stream in 1830 created a large expanse of water which is now bordered by gunneras, lysichitums and Cornish Red rhododendron. There are many fine specimens of rhododendrons, magnolias and camellias.

Gallery

References 

Roads in Cornwall
Hamlets in Cornwall